Bekdash may refer to:
Garabogaz, Turkmenistan - formerly Bekdash
Khordzor, Armenia - formerly Bekdash